Jerry Daanen is a former player in the National Football League for the St. Louis Cardinals from 1968–1970 as a wide receiver. He played at the collegiate level at the University of Miami.

Biography
Daanen was born Jerome Theodore Daanen on December 15, 1944 in Green Bay, Wisconsin.

References

1944 births
St. Louis Cardinals (football) players
Sportspeople from Green Bay, Wisconsin
Players of American football from Wisconsin
Living people
Miami Hurricanes football players